Up Jumped a Swagman is a 1965 British musical comedy film directed by Christopher Miles and starring Frank Ifield, Annette Andre, Ronald Radd and Suzy Kendall. It includes the songs "Waltzing Matilda" and "I Remember You".

Premise
An aspiring Australian singer moves to London in the hope of a big breakthrough. He chases after a popular model, not noticing the beautiful daughter of a pub owner who loves him. He also gets involved with a gang of thieves.

Cast
 Frank Ifield – Dave Kelly 
 Annette Andre – Patsy 
 Ronald Radd – Harry King 
 Suzy Kendall – Melissa Smythe-Fury 
 Richard Wattis – Lever, Music Publisher 
 Donal Donnelly – Bockeye 
 Bryan Mosley – Jo-Jo 
 Martin Miller – Herman 
 Harvey Spencer – Luigi
 Carl Jaffe – Analyst 
 Cyril Shaps – Phil Myers 
 Frank Cox – Wilkinson 
 Fred Cox – Docherty 
 Joan Geary – Mrs. Hawkes Fenhoulet 
 William Mervyn – Mr. Hawkes Fenhoulet
 Gerald Harper - Publicity Man
 Gillian Bowden - Dancer

Production
The film was made when Frank Ifield was at the height of his popularity, and attempts to reproduce the success of Cliff Richard's musicals. Ifield's agent, Leslie Grade, suggested another one of his clients, Christopher Miles, as director. Miles was only 25 and had never made a feature film before. He said the script was to be written by the people who wrote Richard's musicals:
Unfortunately the two writers of the Cliff pictures were not then on speaking terms, so the two halves of a rather soggy script arrived separately in the post, and not surprisingly made no sense at all. So Leslie, not one to be beaten, got an old writer friend from ITV, Lewis Greifer, saying "He's the man, I know you'll get on well" which we did. However, thinking up a credible vehicle for Frank, amiable and charming as he was, proved to me that ultimately you cannot make a celluloid purse out of a sow's ear, even though Frank was gamely willing to send himself up. It was going to have to be a small budget, and to save money I was asked to use a new film saving invention – the dreaded 'Techniscope' process. By only using two sprocket holes for each frame (instead of the standard four) a narrow negative was created, which had a sort of wide-screen look. However, in 1965 colour film stock was still rather grainy, which showed when the final picture was blown up for the large cinema screen. 
Miles also said the leading lady fell pregnant before shooting started; he replaced her with Suzy Kendall (making her film debut).

The film was shot at MGM's London studios at Boreham Wood, with exteriors at Gravesend Docks, St. Paul's Cathedral, Hyde Park, the Albert Memorial and Elstree town.

Annette Andre, an Australian actor living in London, was cast in the female lead. She called it "A very strange film. Good cast. Frank was nice, I was just never a fan of his singing. But he was pleasant. I was young enough to have fun with it. At the time, it was good work and I was thrilled to be doing it. "

Miles later reflected:
It was a baptism of fire but it taught me a lot about making a feature. It taught me that you cannot make a celluloid purse out of a sow's ear. You must get the script right first... Bunuel made musicals at one time and he probably destroyed the negatives by now. Like me, he needed the money.

Songs
Songs featured include:
"Once A Jolly Swagman" 
"Look Don't Touch" 	
"I Remember You"
"I've Got A Hole In My Pocket"
"I'll Never Feel This Way Again"
"Cry Wolf"
"Wild Rover"
"Make It Soon"
"Botany Bay"
"Lovin' On My Mind"
"I Guess"
"Waltzing Matilda"

Reception
A script for a follow-up Ifield movie was prepared but never made.

Home media
It was released on DVD in 2014.

References

External links

Up Jumped the Swagman at Christopher Miles' website
Behind-the-scenes look at making the film at British Pathe

1965 films
Films directed by Christopher Miles
British musical comedy films
1960s English-language films
1960s British films